Tamba  is a genus of moths in the family Erebidae. It was erected by Francis Walker in 1869.

Taxonomy
The genus has previously been classified in the Catocalinae or Calpinae subfamilies of the Erebidae or Noctuidae families.

Characteristics
This is a large but morphologically uniform genus of rather delicate erebid moths with distinctively patterned wings, the hindwings usually having most elements of the forewing pattern. The ground color of the wings is usually pale fawn or grayish, and the forewing postmedial line is usually angled or curved round the discal area, though its more posterior oblique section may be continued by one of its components towards the apex. The male antennae are ciliate, and the legs are often tufted with scale crests and hair pencils. The labial palps are typical for catocalines.

Species

 Tamba albidalis Walker, 1865
 Tamba andrica Prout, 1932
 Tamba angulata Candeze, 1927
 Tamba apicata Hampson, 1902
 Tamba ardescens Prout, 1926
 Tamba basiscripta Walker, 1864
 Tamba capatra Swinhoe, 1903
 Tamba carneotincta Hampson, 1926
 Tamba carnitincta Hampson, 1926
 Tamba chloroplaga Bethune-Baker, 1906
 Tamba cinnamomea Leech, 1900
 Tamba coeruleobasis Kobes, 1989
 Tamba conscripta Lucas, 1892
 Tamba corealis Leech, 1889
 Tamba cosmoloma Prout, 1928
 Tamba costinotata Butler, 1881
 Tamba cyrtogramma Turner, 1908
 Tamba decolor Walker, 1865
 Tamba delicata Prout, 1932
 Tamba diaphora Prout, 1932
 Tamba dichroma Prout, 1932
 Tamba dinawa Bethune-Baker, 1906
 Tamba elachista Hampson, 1926
 Tamba elegans Pagenstecher, 1884
 Tamba euryodia Prout, 1932
 Tamba flaviolata Hampson, 1926
 Tamba fulvivenis Bethune-Baker, 1910
 Tamba gensanalis Leech, 1889
 Tamba grandis Turner, 1933
 Tamba griseipars  Hampson, 1926
 Tamba haemacta Turner, 1908
 Tamba hemiionia Hampson, 1926
 Tamba hieroglyphica Hampson, 1926
 Tamba ionomera Hampson, 1926
 Tamba kebea Bethune-Baker, 1906
 Tamba lahera Swinhoe, 1897
 Tamba lala Swinhoe, 1900
 Tamba lineifera Walker, 1865
 Tamba lorio Swinhoe, 1903
 Tamba magniplaga Swinhoe, 1902
 Tamba malayana Prout, 1932
 Tamba meeki Bethune-Baker, 1906
 Tamba megaspila Warren, 1903
 Tamba mindoro Felder, 1874
 Tamba mnionomera Hampson, 1926
 Tamba multiplaga Swinhoe, 1901
 Tamba nigrilinea Walker, 1869
 Tamba nigrilineata Wileman, 1915
 Tamba ochra Prout, 1932
 Tamba ochracea Prout, 1932
 Tamba ochreistriga Bethune-Baker, 1906
 Tamba ochrodes Swinhoe, 1899
 Tamba olivacea Pagenstecher, 1884
 Tamba pallida Prout, 1925
 Tamba palliolata Swinhoe, 1890
 Tamba parallela Wileman, 1915
 Tamba plumipes Hampson, 1926
 Tamba pronoa Turner
 Tamba prunescens Hampson, 1926
 Tamba punctistigma Hampson, 1895
 Tamba reduplicalis Walker, 1865
 Tamba rufipennis Hampson, 1895
 Tamba scopulina Hampson, 1926
 Tamba sidonalis Swinhoe, 1917
 Tamba sobana Kobes, 1983
 Tamba sondaicus Snellen, 1877
 Tamba splendida Prout, 1926
 Tamba submicacea Walker, 1869
 Tamba syndesma Lower, 1903
 Tamba tephraea Turner, 1909
 Tamba tessellata Bethune-Baker, 1906
 Tamba thermeola Hampson, 1926
 Tamba usurpatalis Walker, 1858
 Tamba vandenberghi Prout, 1932
 Tamba vinolia Hampson, 1895

References

Boletobiinae
Noctuoidea genera